The Mexican sheartail (Doricha eliza) is a species of hummingbird in the family Trochilidae. It is endemic to Mexico.

Description
This is a tiny bird, weighing only . All Mexican sheartails have a long, curved and black bill, a dull green crown and bronzy-green nape and upperparts. Males and females are sexual dimorphic. His underparts are dull green, being clearer on median belly and feathers cover his undertail. The male's tail is long and deeply forked, usually held closed in repose. His inner tail are feathers green, the rest being black with cinnamon inner margins. Her throat, chest and belly are whitish with cinnamon tinges on the sides. The female has a shorter forked tail, the outer feathers of which are reddish with a subterminal black band and white tips. Immatures are similar to females.

Distribution and habitat 
It is found only in Mexico where it lives in two disjunct populations, one in the center of Veracruz and the other in the northern coastal area of the Yucatan Peninsula.
Its natural habitats are subtropical or tropical dry forest, subtropical or tropical dry shrubland, mangroves, rural gardens and urban areas. A specific example of the mangrove habitat is the Petenes mangroves ecoregion in the Yucatán Peninsula.
The species is threatened by habitat loss.

Behaviour
The Mexican sheartail feeds on nectar from flowers and has been seen visiting Ipomoea, Justicia and Helicteres guazumaefolia. It also sometimes consumes small arthropods. In Veracruz, breeding takes place from May onwards and in Yucatán, between August and April. The tiny cup-shaped nest is made of lichens, spiders webs and the seeds of daisy family plants. Two eggs are laid and newly fledged young have been reported from Yucatán in February and March.

Status
The Mexican sheartail has a small range divided into parts. There are estimated to be fewer than 2500 individuals in the Veracruz population and somewhere between 6,000 and 10,000 in the Yucatán coastal strip. Both are suffering habitat degradation, the former from agricultural and residential development and the latter from development related to tourism. It is likely that the population of these birds is in decline and the IUCN have listed this species as being "Near Threatened".

References

Further reading
 World Wildlife Fund. 2010. Petenes mangroves. eds. Mark McGinley, C.Michael Hogan & C. Cleveland. Encyclopedia of Earth. National Council for Science and the Environment. Washington DC

External links

Mexican sheartail
Birds of the Yucatán Peninsula
Endemic birds of Mexico
Mexican sheartail
Taxa named by René Lesson
Taxonomy articles created by Polbot